Scaphydra is a genus of beetles in the family Hydroscaphidae, containing the following species:

 Scaphydra angra (Reichardt, 1971)
 Scaphydra hintoni (Reichardt, 1971)
 Scaphydra pygmaea (Reichardt, 1971)

References

Myxophaga genera